Elections were held on November 12, 1985 in the Regional Municipality of Ottawa-Carleton. This page lists the election results for local mayors and councils of the RMOC in 1985.

Regional Council
The following were elected to regional council either directly on election day or by the local councils afterward. Chair Andy Haydon was re-elected by council without any opposition.

Cumberland
Mayoral race

Council

Gloucester
Mayoral race

Council

Goulbourn
Mayoral race

Council

Hydro Commission
Four to be elected

Kanata
Mayoral race

Council

Nepean
Mayoral race
(259 of 260 polls)

Council
(259 of 260 polls)

Hydro Commission
258 of 260 polls
Four to be elected

Osgoode

Mayoral race

Council
Four elected at large. Elected councillors indicated in bold.

Ottawa

Mayor race

Rideau
Mayoral race

Council

Rockcliffe Park
Mayoral race

Council
Four elected at large. Elected councillors indicated in bold.

Vanier
Mayoral race

Council

West Carleton
Mayoral race

Council

References

Sources
Ottawa Citizen, November 13, 1985

Municipal elections in Ottawa
1985 Ontario municipal elections